Tai Mo Shan Road is a road in New Territories, Hong Kong. It originates from Route Twisk and leads to (but does not terminate at) the weather station at the top of Tai Mo Shan. Paved the whole way, the upper-most roughly  route is blocked by a manned barrier gate, and is hence inaccessible to motor vehicles, except those on government or military service. A carpark exists at this point. Bicycles and pedestrians are permitted past this barrier, with cyclists not permitted to go beyond the boundaries of the paved road (i.e. past where the road ends or to the left/right of the road).

Cows and oxen may be encountered along the length of the road. Several pull-off points exist along the road.

Until mid-2009, Stage 8 of the MacLehose Trail started at the road's intersection with Route Twisk, and ran along the entire section of Tai Mo Shan Road, and then continued towards Lead Mine Pass. The section of Stage 8 between Route Twisk and the car park now starts at the Kowloon Motor Bus stop on Route Twisk and is diverted to a nearby dirt track with steps so that hikers and motorists are segregated. However, the original route still forms part of the annual Oxfam Trailwalker to avoid confusion.

Though rarely, the road may be covered by ice just like on 24 January 2016 or during other extreme cold waves.

See also
 List of streets and roads in Hong Kong

References

External links

 CentaLink map of Tai Mo Shan Road
 HK AFCD - MacLehose Trail Stage 8
 HKO Press Release - Inauguration of Tai Mo Shan Weather Radar and Supercomputer

Gallery

Roads in the New Territories